NetHope, Inc. is a global consortium of nearly 60 global nonprofit organizations that specializes in improving IT connectivity among humanitarian organizations in developing countries and areas affected by disaster. The organization has partnerships with Accenture, Amazon, Cisco, Facebook, Google, Microsoft, Oracle NetSuite and more than 60 leading technology companies. Its humanitarian development, emergency response, and conservation programs are in place in 180 countries. It was founded in 2001.

Founding

In March 2001, Edward G. Happ, then CIO of Save the Children, authored a paper entitled "Wiring the Global Village" that discussed two hypotheses:
 International nonprofits could solve the connection problem better, faster, and cheaper if done together rather than reinventing the wheel as individual organizations; and
 Nonprofits would be in a better position to partner with corporate sponsors as a group rather than as individuals.
This paper was presented to Cisco's corporate philanthropy group and became the basis for NetHope. Soon, Cisco fellow Dipak Basu coined the name "NetHope".

Work

Places of operation
NetHope members operate in over 180 countries around the world. NetHope also operates four chapters in the following areas: Africa, Asia, Europe and North America. NetHope is based in McLean, Virginia, but operates with staff in North America, Europe, and Africa.

NetReliefKit
Working with Cisco Systems and British satellite firm Inmarsat, NetHope developed the NetReliefKit, which is a solar powered wireless router that can connect users to the Internet via a satellite uplink. They were distributed for use with nonprofit organizations such as Save the Children, Catholic Relief Services, Oxfam, and Mercy Corps. The kits are meant to be used for relief agencies to coordinate their response efforts. The device was deployed to provide Internet connectivity after the 2004 Indian Ocean earthquake.

Disaster response

2015 Syrian refugee crisis, Europe 
During the summer of 2015 and into 2016, NetHope installed wireless networks and mobile phone recharging systems along the European refugee migration route at more than 76 locations, including refugee camps and community centers.  Most of these sites were in Greece, with several others deployed in the Balkans and Central Europe.  In addition to providing network connectivity for refugee and aid workers' smartphones and other devices, NetHope partnered with Cisco's Tactical Operations and Microsoft to deploy cybersecurity protection to mitigate the risk that organized crime or combatants related to the Syrian Civil War might attempt to compromise sensitive information on user devices.  Since the fall of 2015, the network has supported more than 600,000 devices, making it the largest purpose-built humanitarian network to date.

2013 Typhoon Haiyan, Philippines
On 8 November 2013, Typhoon Haiyan (known in the Philippines as Typhoon Yolanda), the largest typhoon in recorded history cut across the Visayas area of the Philippines. Over 14.1 million Filipinos were affected by the disaster and over 1.1 million houses were damaged either by strong winds or the storm surge that followed.

During the immediate disaster response, NetHope worked as part of the Emergency Telecommunications Cluster (ETC) to coordinate and establish connectivity in the worst affected areas. Members of the ETC worked together to provide connectivity to international and local response organizations in each location regardless of which ETC member provided the equipment and bandwidth.

NetHope, along with its partner British Telecom, established VSAT data services and VOIP voice services in Borongan, Roxas, and Estancia. Furthermore, NetHope acquired six Ku-Band VSAT terminals and received donated satellite bandwidth from AsiaSat, Speedcast, and SES. These were used to provide connectivity in Bogo, Concepcion, Bantayan Island, Maya, Carigara, and additional connectivity in Estancia. The donated bandwidth and services were scheduled to an end at the end of February 2014 when broadband or mobile data connectivity was scheduled be reinstated in most of these areas.

The following NetHope member organizations responded to Typhoon Haiyan: AmeriCares, Canadian Red Cross, CARE, Catholic Relief Services, ChildFund International, Christian Aid, Concern Worldwide, Direct Relief, Habitat for Humanity, Heifer International, International Federation of Red Cross/Red Crescent (IFRC), International Medical Corps (IMC), International Rescue Committee (IRC), Islamic Relief, Mercy Corps, Oxfam International, Plan International, Save the Children, SOS Children’s Villages, and World Vision International.

2010 Haiti earthquake

Within days of the 7.0 earthquake that destroyed much of Haiti, NetHope responded by setting up telecommunications links among a dozen relief groups, thanks largely in part to a $1.25 million donation from Microsoft and its partnerships with Cisco and Intel. The 10 megabyte local network provided Internet connectivity and extensions to voice over Internet protocol (VoIP)-style phones so that NetHope's members could coordinate the delivery of supplies in Haiti and send need assessments to the rest of the world.

However, the temporary network came under criticism a month later from local Internet Service Providers (ISPs) who said that this temporary network was taking away their business. Inveneo, the company that NetHope tapped to build the network, defended the action by saying that in the days after the earthquake it was critical for NGOs to have reliable connectivity in order to coordinate their actions using resources such as Google Maps. Local ISP wired networks appeared to remain functional in the aftermath of the earthquake, but had lost electricity to their wireless base stations. An agreement between Inveneo and the local ISPs was to be made so ISPs would start receiving money from NGOs using their bandwidth.

2004 Asia tsunami
NetHope had already been developing the NetReliefKit with Cisco and Inmarsat, but when the tsunami in the Pacific hit, they saw it was necessary for NGOs to communicate with each other immediately, as many had lost this capability.

References

Further reading
 Fundamentals of Information Systems
 Information and Communication Technology for Peace
 The Retirement Activities Guide
 Principles of Information Systems
 Nonprofit Guide to Going Green
 PC World
 The Irish Times 
 The Irish Times 
 Stanford Social Innovation Review

External links
 
 

Non-profit corporations